= Mutawad =

- Village
- Country: India
- State: Karnataka
- District: Belgaum
- Talukas: Saudatti (Parasagada)

Population (2001)
  - Total: Approx 3,500

Languages
  - Official: Kannada
- Time zone: UTC+5:30 (IST)
- PIN: 591121
- Telephone code: 08337
- Vehicle registration: KA-24
- Nearest city: Bailhongal (10km)
- Literacy: 90 M-60%, F-40%%
- Lok Sabha constituency: Belagavi
- Vidhan Sabha constituency: Bailhongal

Mutawad is a village in Belgavi district of Karnataka, India. Mutawad means rich village in entire area and hold a Fort. Fort have three famous temples, Veerabhadra, Mallikarjuna and Goddess Balalekka and a pond. Fort have big doors near front gate there is an Hanuman Temple. Mutawad is rich historical place it had lot of old temples that all shows our old art on stones, culture. Lot of students, Architecture teams came Mutawad for research of historical writings.
